Elections to Sheffield City Council were held on 7 May 1992. One third of the council was up for election.

Election result

|- style="background-color:#F9F9F9"
! style="background-color: " |
| Wealth Redistribution
| align="right" | 0
| align="right" | 0
| align="right" | 0
| align="right" | 0
| align="right" | 0.0
| align="right" | 0.0
| align="right" | 65
| align="right" | -0.1
|-

This result had the following consequences for the total number of seats on the Council after the elections:

Ward results

Edward Lamb was a sitting councillor for Heeley ward

|- style="background-color:#F9F9F9"
! style="background-color: " |
| Wealth Redistribution
| Simon Rawlins
| align="right" | 65
| align="right" | 2.6
| align="right" | -0.8
|-

John Butler was a sitting councillor for Norton ward

By-elections between 1992 and 1994

References

1992 English local elections
1992
1990s in Sheffield